State Route 169 (SR 169) is a state highway in Clark County, Nevada, United States. It connects the northern reaches of Lake Mead National Recreation Area to Interstate 15 (I-15) via Moapa Valley and the communities of Overton and Logandale. It is also called Northshore Road, Moapa Valley Boulevard, and Logandale Road.

Route description

From this point, SR 169 winds northward approximately  before entering the rural town of Overton and becoming Moapa Valley Boulevard. On the southern outskirts of Overton, the route passes by the Lost City Museum, a historical landmark built on the site of an Anasazi village called Pueblo Grande de Nevada that was estimated to have been settled circa 300–500 BC. As SR 169 travels northward through Overton, it forms the main road through the rural town while paralleling a Union Pacific railroad line to the west and the Muddy River to the east. The route transitions into the town of Logandale,  winding its way northwestward as the main thoroughfare through the rural community.

History

A road appearing in the approximate alignment of SR 169 appears on official state highway maps as early as 1933. The portion between US 91 and Logandale was paved by 1935, with pavement reaching Overton the next year. By 1937, the completion of Hoover Dam and subsequent creation of Lake Mead caused the town of St. Thomas to be submerged and also resulted in SR 12 being severed into two pieces by the filling lake. The eastern end of SR 12 was removed from maps by 1940, leaving a  paved route from Lake Mead (near the St. Thomas site) to US 91.

SR 12 remained unchanged for many years after this. In 1976, the Nevada Department of Transportation began an effort to renumber its state highways. During this process, the SR 12 designation along Logandale Road was proposed to be combined with the SR 40 designation along Valley of Fire Road to create a new State Route 169, leaving the roughly  southeastern edge as SR 12. This new highway designation was first seen on state highway maps in 1978. However, it appears that ultimately the SR 40 section was not included in the new route designation—the present-day SR 169 alignment appears on the 1982 map while the Valley of Fire Road and southernmost miles of SR 12 were left without new state route numbers.

Major intersections

See also

References

External links

169
Transportation in Clark County, Nevada